This is a summary of the electoral history of George Forbes, Prime Minister of New Zealand (1930–35) and Member of Parliament for Hurunui (1908–43).

Parliamentary elections

1902 election

1908 election

1911 election

1914 election

1919 election

1922 election

1925 election

1928 election

1931 election

1935 election

1938 election

References

Bibliography

Forbes, George